Jordan Krestanovich (born June 14, 1981) is a Canadian former professional ice hockey player who served as a player-head coach for the Braehead Clan in the British Elite Ice Hockey League. He played in the National Hockey League (NHL) with the Colorado Avalanche.

Playing career
As a youth, Krestanovich played in the 1994 Quebec International Pee-Wee Hockey Tournament with a minor ice hockey team from Surrey, British Columbia.

Krestanovich was drafted by the Colorado Avalanche in the fifth round, 152nd overall in the 1999 NHL Entry Draft. Jordan played junior hockey with the Calgary Hitmen of the Western Hockey League, winning the President's Cup in 1999, prior to being drafted.

He turned pro in 2001, spending several years with the Avalanche's American Hockey League affiliate, the Hershey Bears with brief appearances for the Avalanche in 2001–02 and 2003–04.

On March 8, 2004, Krestanovich was traded from the Avalanche to the Minnesota Wild for Chris Bala, only to play with the Wild's AHL affiliate, the Houston Aeros.

A free agent, Krestanovich signed with the Pensacola Ice Pilots of the ECHL for the 2004–05 season before spending the following year overseas with Mora IK of the Elitserien and Bolzano HC of the Italian Serie-A. In 2006–07, Jordan returned to the Ice Pilots of the ECHL before he was traded to become the captain of the Victoria Salmon Kings.

On August 6, 2008, Krestanovich left again for the Italian Hockey League signing with SG Cortina. After finishing second on Cortina with 37 points in the 2009–10 season Krestanovich was signed to a one-year contract by Czech team BK Mladá Boleslav of the Czech Extraliga on June 25, 2010.

On 4 November 2010, Krestanovich was signed as a free agent by former team-mate Bruce Richardson to a one-year contract with Scottish team Braehead Clan of the Elite Ice Hockey League. On 23 May 2011 Krestanovich re-signed with the Braehead Clan for the 2011/12 season. He was made captain with Jade Galbraith and Tim Wedderburn as his alternates.

On June 15, 2012, the Braehead Clan announced that Krestanovich had been appointed as the new player/coach following the departure of Drew Bannister.

Career statistics

References

External links
 

1981 births
Bolzano HC players
Braehead Clan players
Calgary Hitmen players
Canadian ice hockey defencemen
Colorado Avalanche draft picks
Colorado Avalanche players
Hershey Bears players
Houston Aeros (1994–2013) players
Ice hockey people from British Columbia
Living people
Mora IK players
Pensacola Ice Pilots players
People from Langley, British Columbia (city)
Victoria Salmon Kings players
Canadian expatriate ice hockey players in the United States
Canadian expatriate ice hockey players in Scotland
Canadian expatriate ice hockey players in Italy
Canadian expatriate ice hockey players in Sweden